Research on Aging is a peer-reviewed academic journal that covers the field of social gerontology. The editor-in-chief is Jeffrey A. Burr (University of Massachusetts Boston). It was established in 1979 and is published by SAGE Publications.

Abstracting and indexing 
Research on Aging  is abstracted and indexed in Scopus and the Social Sciences Citation Index. According to the Journal Citation Reports, its 2012 impact factor is 1.298, ranking it 13th out of 30 journals in the category "Gerontology".

References

External links 
 

SAGE Publishing academic journals
English-language journals
Bimonthly journals
Gerontology journals
Publications established in 1979